Angela Farmer (born c. 1939) is a teacher of modern yoga as exercise in a non-lineage style that emphasizes the feminine, free-flowing aspect. She is known also as the creator of the first yoga mat.

She was trained by the yoga guru B. K. S. Iyengar for ten years, becoming a senior teacher of his strict and precise Iyengar Yoga style. She became uncomfortable with this, and left to teach her own much freer style of yoga, admired by other yoga teachers.

Early life 

Farmer grew up near London, her father Richard Farmer being English, her mother American. She studied physical education and dance. In her teens, she had surgery to cut several nerves, leaving her with reduced sensitivity to touch and "intense and chronic pain". After college, she practised Sufism.

In 1967, working as a schoolteacher, she attended her first yoga class. Six months later, she met the yoga guru B. K. S. Iyengar. She studied under him for the following ten years, in London and in his yoga institute in Pune, India, becoming an Iyengar Yoga teacher.

Epiphany 

In the late 1970s, Farmer switched from the strictly disciplined Iyengar style of teaching to a freestyle yoga, losing most of her students in the process. Among the reasons was that the intense Iyengar Yoga practice had caused her menstrual cycles to stop. The yoga teacher Richard Rosen describes Farmer's transformation from a "dyed-in-the-wool Iyengar-ite, trained by the Boss himself" to teaching a yoga of "free-flowing, serpentine-like, 'feminine' performances" as an "epiphany". While teaching Iyengar Yoga, she had become increasingly uncomfortable with its "relatively rigid “masculine” influence". Farmer told how she visited a Hindu temple that was adorned with sensuous sculptures of female figures. From then on, she taught a form of yoga free from the rigidity of predefined "postures".

Invention of yoga mat  

In 1982, while teaching yoga in Germany, Farmer created the original yoga mat, consisting of carpet underlay cut to towel size during yoga classes. She later returned home to London with the material. Angela's father contacted the German padding manufacturer and became the first retailer of "sticky mats".

Teaching 

Farmer teaches yoga in Yellow Springs, Ohio, in California, in other parts of America, and in other countries. Each summer she and her partner Victor Van Kooten teach yoga in their studio in the Eftalou valley in Lesbos in Greece. They began teaching together in 1984 and have continued to do so for over 25 years. They lead immersive courses in yoga on Lesbos lasting two to three weeks, four times a year. Farmer and Van Kooten call their approach "yoga from the inside out". Farmer uses imagery, intentionally fluid movements and conscious breathing to explore the prana energy that in her view animates and guides the body.

Claudia Cummins, in Yoga Journal writes: "Ask devoted students to describe Angela Farmer's teaching, and they'll offer words like freedom, empowerment, surrender, and transformation. They'll describe her approach as soft, fluid, internal, feminine, open, and playful". The "superstar" yoga teacher Donna Farhi studied under Farmer, and like her eventually switched to a freestyle form. Carolyn Brown, in Yogi Times, writes that a yoga class by Farmer and Van Kooten gives no clue to their training under Iyengar, as their style has evolved away from his strictness into a "more organic, self-expressive and self-healing way of practicing". The mindful yoga teacher Anne Cushman, in her 2014 book Moving into Meditation, calls Farmer an "extraordinary" yoga teacher, and credits her with shaping Cushman's "exploratory, sensate approach to asana practice." Rosen writes that Farmer and Van Kooten "form one of yoga’s most dynamic teaching duos." 

The yoga scholar-practitioner Theodora Wildcroft, in her book on post-lineage yoga, describes Farmer as among the "little-known radical yoga practitioners" who began the movement away from lineages of yoga gurus by "publicly distanc[ing] themselves from the Iyengar Yoga system". She then became a leading yoga teacher in her own right. Wildcroft likens her to Vanda Scaravelli, a yoga teacher who studied directly under B. K. S. Iyengar, as both women took what they saw as a "patriarchal practice" and used it to explore the "divine feminine" through the movements that they taught. Wildcroft reports that Van Kooten claims to have been "seriously hurt" by Iyengar, and that both Farmer and Van Kooten were "blacklisted or denigrated" in some manner by Iyengar Yoga. Also like Scaravelli, Farmer avoided giving her name to any yoga school, precisely in order to avoid the "institutionalisation of personal charisma" that they were reacting against. According to Wildcroft, the post-lineage yoga teachers Uma Dinsmore-Tuli and her partner Nirlipta Tuli are among those inspired by Farmer's teaching.

In the media 

Farmer is featured as one of the "yoga experts" on the 2011 film Yogawoman.

References

Sources

External links 

 

American yoga teachers
1939 births
Modern yoga pioneers
Living people